Shigetaka "Steve" Sasaki (20 March 1903 – 26 February 1993) was a Japanese and Canadian judoka who founded the first judo club in Canada and is considered the 'Father of Canadian Judo'. After establishing the Tai Iku Dojo in Vancouver in 1924, Sasaki and his students opened several branch schools in British Columbia. In 1941, however, all dojos were shut down by the government and their Japanese members forced into internment camps due to fears that Japanese-Canadians would act against Canada on behalf of Japan during the Second World War. After the War was over, the government encouraged internees to relocate, and many of Sasaski's students went on to establish their own dojos across Canada. Sasaki was inducted into the Canadian Olympic Hall of Fame in 1986 as a 'builder'.

See also
Judo in British Columbia
Judo in Canada
List of Canadian judoka

References

External links
Large collection of photographs of Sasaki and associates (Canadian Nikkei National Museum)
Two photographs of Sasaki, including one with Jigoro Kano (UBC Library Digital Collection)

Canadian male judoka
Canadian sportspeople of Japanese descent
Japanese-Canadian internees
1903 births
1993 deaths